Lalpania is a census town in the Gomia CD block in the Bermo subdivision of the Bokaro district in the Indian state of Jharkhand..

Geography

Location

Area overview
Bokaro district consists of undulating uplands on the Chota Nagpur Plateau with the Damodar River cutting a valley right across. The East Bokaro Coalfield located in the Bermo-Phusro area and small intrusions of Jharia Coalfield make Bokaro a coal rich district. In 1965, one of the largest steel manufacturing units in the country, Bokaro Steel Plant, operated by Steel Authority of India Limited, was set-up at Bokaro Steel City. The Damodar Valley Corporation established its first thermal power station at Bokaro (Thermal). The soil is generally infertile and agriculture is mostly rain-fed.

Note: The map alongside presents some of the notable locations in the district. All places marked in the map are linked in the larger full screen map.

Demographics
According to the 2011 Census of India, Lalpania had a total population of 3,659 of which 1,867 (51%) were males and 1,792 (49%) were females. Population in the agerange 0-6 years was 541. The total number of literate persons in Lalpania was 2,088 (85.21% of the population over 6 years).

Infrastructure
According to the District Census Handbook 2011, Bokaro, Lalpania  covered an area of 5.17 km2. Among the civic amenities, it had 8 km roads with both open and closed drains, the protected water supply involved uncovered well, tapwater from treated sources, overhead tank. It had 691 domestic electric connections. Among the medical facilities, it had 1 hospital, 1 dispensary, 1 health centre, 7 family welfare centres, 2 maternity and child welfare centres, 1 nursing home, no  medicine shop. Among the educational facilities it had 6 primary schools, 2 middle schools, 2 secondary schools, 1 senior secondary school, 1 general degree college. It had 1 non-formal educational centre (Sarva Siksha Abhiyan). It had the branch office of 1 nationalised bank.

Economy

Power
Tenughat Thermal Power Station is located at Lalpania and is owned by the state-owned Tenughat Vidyut Nigam Ltd. It operates a 2x210 MW power plant.

References

Cities and towns in Bokaro district